The 2006 New York gubernatorial election took place on November 7, 2006, to elect the governor and lieutenant governor of New York, concurrently with elections to the United States Senate in other states and elections to the United States House of Representatives and various state and local elections, then incumbent Republican governor George Pataki chose not to run for re-election in a fourth term. Democrat Eliot Spitzer, the New York Attorney General, won the election over former Republican state Assembly minority leader John Faso. As of 2023, this is the last time the Governor’s office in New York changed partisan control.

Spitzer was slated to serve between January 1, 2007, and December 31, 2010, but he announced his resignation on March 12, 2008 (effective March 17, 2008), amid news of his involvement in a prostitution scandal.  Spitzer was succeeded on March 17 by Lieutenant Governor David Paterson. This was the first open-seat election since 1982.

To date, he is the last Democratic candidate for governor to have carried any of the following counties: Genesee County, Chautauqua County, Cattaraugus County, Niagara County, Fulton County, Steuben County, Tioga County or Schoharie County.

Primaries

Democratic Primary
Eliot Spitzer – at the time was the New York State Attorney General (1999–2006) According to speeches on his website, Spitzer supported reducing property taxes, lowering the cost of health care; reducing energy costs and reforming workers' compensation. He also proposed urban revitalization, small business incentives, health insurance for every child, reducing Medicaid fraud and abuse and reducing prescription drug costs.  Spitzer was nominated on September 12, 2006, over rival Thomas Suozzi. The results of the primary were:

Eliot Spitzer was the nominee of the Democratic party of New York for governor. On December 7, 2004, Spitzer announced his intention to seek the Democratic nomination for the 2006 election for Governor of New York. Spitzer's campaign manager was Ryan Toohey of Global Strategy Group, which Spitzer had hired for his 1998 campaign for attorney general and for the gubernatorial campaign. While long rumored, Spitzer's announcement was nevertheless considered unusually early—nearly two years before the day of the gubernatorial election. Some pundits believed the timing of Spitzer's announcement was due to Spitzer's desire to see if Senator Charles Schumer, a more senior Democrat, would run. Schumer, who was largely favored in opinion polls in a hypothetical matchup against Spitzer, announced in November that he would not run for governor, instead accepting an offer to sit on the powerful Finance Committee and head the Democratic Senatorial Campaign Committee. After Schumer announced he would maintain his Senate seat, another Democrat, Andrew Cuomo, announced his plans to run for Spitzer's vacated Attorney General's seat.

Spitzer won an early vote of confidence on January 22, 2005, by gaining the endorsement of the Working Families Party, which has taken advantage of New York's electoral fusion system to act as a kingmaker over Democratic nominees. It is backed heavily by figures from community group ACORN and  labor unions, particularly those that broke from the AFL–CIO to form the Change to Win Federation. In the months after the WFP endorsement, several Change to Win unions have announced that they are endorsing Spitzer under their own name, including UNITE HERE, the Teamsters, and the United Food and Commercial Workers.

In the latter half of 2005, Spitzer sought to further solidify support for his campaign by touring the state, seeking and giving political endorsements. These included cross endorsements with former-Bronx Borough President Fernando Ferrer in the New York City Mayoral election, Matthew Driscoll in the Syracuse Mayoral election, and State Senator Byron Brown in the Buffalo Mayoral election. The benefit to Spitzer in these endorsement deals was valuable media attention as he stumped for the candidates.

As a result of Spitzer's relative speed in uniting state Democrats to his side, he had gained the respect of Democratic leaders nationwide. Bill Richardson dubbed Spitzer the "future of the Democratic Party", at a fundraiser held in June 2005 for Spitzer's gubernatorial campaign.

With a large polling lead in the Democratic primary, the June 2006 Quinnipiac University Polling Institute poll showed him leading Nassau county executive Thomas Suozzi 76–13 percent, compared to a 73–13 percent lead in a May 17, 2006 poll.

Much of the attention of watchers of New York politics then turned to the state Republican Party, especially the future of three-term governor George Pataki. Polling throughout 2004 and into 2005 consistently showed Spitzer defeating Pataki in theoretical matchups. Such a scenario may have proved unappealing to Pataki. At the time, he was making overtures toward seeking the Republican nomination for the presidency in 2008. Pataki announced on July 27, 2005, that he would not seek re-election and would step down at the end of his term in January 2007.

The open-seat nature of the election, along with Spitzer's positive poll numbers, and the advantage Democrats have in New York State had fueled discussion of the Republican leadership's active pursuit of candidates to run against Spitzer. By June 2006, two people announced their intention to run for the nomination: former New York Assemblyman John Faso, who was officially endorsed at the 2006 New York State Republican Party Convention, and former Massachusetts Governor William Weld, who is a native New Yorker. Shortly after the convention, Weld dropped out of the race for the Republican nomination.

An additional consideration for Spitzer was the status of billionaire businessman Tom Golisano, a three-time candidate on the Independence Party ballot line. It was rumored that Golisano might run again, and that Republican Party insiders would seek to nominate him on their own party's line, thus fusing the Republican and Independence tickets for the first time in a gubernatorial election. Golisano recently switched his party affiliation to the GOP.  However, on February 1, 2006, Golisano announced that he would not run for governor.

Spitzer selected African-American New York State Senate minority leader David Paterson as his choice for Lieutenant Governor and running mate in January 2006. In New York gubernatorial elections, the most important factor in the gubernatorial candidate's choice of a lieutenant governor is the need to "balance the ticket"—that is, to widen the candidate's appeal, whether by reaching out to someone from a different geographic area, ethnic background, or has a different political base. Paterson's father Basil Paterson was also a candidate for Lt. Governor in 1970.

After announcing his candidacy, Spitzer was endorsed by numerous New Yorkers including state Comptroller Alan Hevesi and former New York City Mayors David Dinkins and Ed Koch (who endorsed President Bush in 2004). In February 2006, Spitzer received the endorsement of then-Democrat businessman Donald Trump, who had been courted by the Republicans to run against him.

In the Democratic primary, held on September 12, 2006, Spitzer handily defeated Suozzi, securing his party's nomination with 82% of the vote.

Republican Primary
John Faso – former state Assembly minority leader (1998–2002), the Republican nominee for state comptroller in 2002. On February 14, Faso launched a statewide campaign ad announcing his candidacy for governor. Later that month, he was endorsed by Conservative Party Chairman Michael Long and by Congressman John Sweeney.  Faso won the nomination at the Republican convention, defeating former Massachusetts Governor Bill Weld, 61%-39%. Following the convention, Weld withdrew from the race as senior party officials (including state Republican chairman Stephen Minarik, who endorsed Weld) urged party unity.  Other unsuccessful candidates included Secretary of State Randy Daniels and Assemblyman Patrick R. Manning.
In 2005, Faso announced his intention to run for governor. He positioned himself early as a conservative upstate candidate, while stressing his childhood roots in Long Island. He initially faced former Massachusetts Governor Bill Weld, former Secretary of State Randy Daniels, and Assemblyman Patrick Manning. Weld, a moderate, was supported by party leadership. Daniels and Manning both dropped out and Faso became the primary challenger to Weld. It has been reported that in early 2006, Weld offered Faso the chance to join his ticket as a candidate for lieutenant governor, an offer Faso reportedly declined. Faso gained increasing support from party leaders in various counties, including Westchester and Suffolk, both of which had large delegate counts to the state convention.

In late May 2006, Faso received the nomination of the Conservative Party for governor, which guaranteed him a spot on the November ballot.  He pledged to continue running for governor on the Conservative line if he lost the Republican primary to Weld. On the day he received the Conservative nomination, Faso announced his selection of Rockland County Executive C. Scott Vanderhoef as his running mate for lieutenant governor.

On June 1, 2006, the Republican State Convention voted 61% to 39% to endorse Faso.  By receiving over 50 percent of the vote, Faso was the designated Republican Party candidate, but Weld still received enough support to force a primary. As The Washington Post put it, "[n]ow it turns out whoever loses the GOP primary will stay in the race—in a position likely to siphon votes from the Republican nominee." For this reason, Weld was under tremendous pressure to drop out of the race.  On June 5,  Stephen J. Minarik, the chairman of the state Republican Party, who had been Weld's most prominent backer, called on Weld to withdraw in the interest of party unity. Weld formally announced his withdrawal from the race, and his support of Faso, the following day.

Other Parties

Green Party
Malachy McCourt – author, actor, talk radio host, raconteur and brother of Frank McCourt.

Libertarian Party
John Clifton was the official Libertarian Party Candidate for governor.

Socialist Worker's Party
Maura DeLuca

Rent Is Too Damn High Party
Jimmy McMillan, Vietnam War veteran and former letter carrier, candidate for mayor of New York City in 2005. In 2006 he sought to run for governor as the candidate of the "My Rent Is Too Damn High Party". The State Board of Elections allowed him on the ballot, but only under the rubric of the "Rent Is Too High Party". That version appeared on Row H.

Campaign

Ticket designations by party

Democratic Party
 
Ticket designated by the 2006 Democratic State Convention
Governor:  Eliot Spitzer
Lieutenant Governor:  David Paterson
Comptroller:  Alan Hevesi
Attorney General:  Andrew Cuomo
U.S. Senate: Hillary Clinton

Republican Party

Ticket designated by the 2006 Republican State Convention
Governor:  John Faso
Lieutenant Governor:  C. Scott Vanderhoef
Attorney General:  Jeanine Pirro
U.S. Senate:  John Spencer

Independence Party

Ticket designated by the Independence Party State Convention
Governor:  Eliot Spitzer
Lieutenant Governor:  David Paterson
Comptroller:  Alan Hevesi
Attorney General:  Jeanine Pirro
U.S. Senate:  Hillary Clinton

Conservative Party

Ticket designated by the Conservative Party Convention
Governor:  John Faso
Lieutenant Governor:  C. Scott Vanderhoef
Attorney General:  Jeanine Pirro
U.S. Senate:  John Spencer

Working Families Party

Ticket designated by the Working Families Party Convention
Governor:  Eliot Spitzer
Lieutenant Governor:  David Paterson
Comptroller:  Alan Hevesi
Attorney General:  Andrew Cuomo
U.S. Senate:  Hillary Clinton

Green Party

Ticket designated by Green Party
 Governor: Malachy McCourt
 Lieutenant Governor: Alison Duncan
 Comptroller: Julia Willebrand
 Attorney General: Rachel Treichler
 U.S. Senate: Howie Hawkins

Integrity Party

Ticket designated by the Integrity Party of New York State
 Governor: Phoebe Legere
 Lieutenant Governor: Nancy Beattie

Libertarian Party

Ticket designated by the Libertarian Party of New York
Governor:  John Clifton
Lieutenant Governor:  Donald Silberger
Comptroller:  John Cain
Attorney General:  Chris Garvey
U.S. Senate:  Jeff Russell

Right to Life Party

Ticket designated by the New York State Right to Life Party
Governor:  Jennifer Liese
Lieutenant Governor:  Wendy Holibaugh
Comptroller:  Michael Cronmiller
Attorney General:  William Conroy
U.S. Senate:  John Spencer

Predictions

Polling

Results

See also
Governorship of George Pataki
United States Senate election in New York, 2006
New York attorney general election, 2006
New York Comptroller election, 2006
United States gubernatorial elections, 2006
1970 New York gubernatorial election

Further reading
Paterson, David "Black, Blind, & In Charge: A Story of Visionary Leadership and Overcoming Adversity." New York, New York, 2020

References

External links
 Online Guide to New York Politics, politics1.com

Candidates
 Eliot Spitzer for Governor
 John Faso for Governor
 John Clifton for Governor
 Malachy McCourt for Governor

Gubernatorial
2006
New York
Eliot Spitzer
David Paterson